Hedwig Edle von Malheim Friedländer, after 1919 Hedwig Friedländer (1863–1945) was an Austrian painter.

Biography
Friedländer was born in 1863. She studied in Munich with Carl Frithjof Smith. She also studied at the School of Applied Arts in Vienna.

Friedländer exhibited her work in the rotunda of The Woman's Building at the 1893 World's Columbian Exposition in Chicago.

She died in 1945.

Gallery

References

External links
 

 
1856 births
1937 deaths
Austrian women painters
19th-century Austrian women artists
20th-century Austrian women artists
19th-century Austrian painters
20th-century Austrian painters